Beyblade: Metal Masters, known in Japan as , is the 2010 sequel to the anime television series Beyblade: Metal Fusion. Like its predecessor, Beyblade: Metal Masters is based on Takafumi Adachi's manga series Beyblade: Metal Fusion, which itself is based on the Beyblade spinning top game from Takara Tomy. The 51-episode series was produced by d-rights and Nelvana under the direction of Kunihisa Sugishima. The series was first broadcast on TV Tokyo in Japan between April 4, 2010 and March 27, 2011. The English series with English opening in Australia on Cartoon Network July 25, 2011, later on Network Ten on November 8, 2011 at 7:30 am and United States on Cartoon Network on August 20, 2011 at 10:30 am. On Canada on YTV September 10, 2011 at 11:30 am.

This series began in India on 22 October 2011 and finished on 7 July 2012 on Cartoon Network India broadcasting  every  saturday and sunday  at 9 PM and it was presented with a Hindi dub , in  Finland on MTV3 November 12, 2011 and finished on August 25, 2012 broadcasting every Saturday at 10:45 am. However, the previous series Beyblade: Metal Fusion was entirely skipped. It is presented with a Finnish dub.

Latin America had sneak preview on July 7, 2012 at 8 am and August 24, 2012 on Disney XD and premiered September 3, 2012 at 1:30 pm, and Brazil had sneak preview on August 12, 2012 at 9 pm and premiered September 3, 2012 on Disney XD.

Two pieces of theme music were used for the opening and closing themes. Beyblade: Metal Masters was followed by a second sequel, Beyblade: Metal Fury.



Episode list

References

Metal Fusion Season 2
2010 Japanese television seasons
2011 Japanese television seasons